Q Division Studios is a recording studio located in Somerville, Massachusetts, United States. Founded in 1986, Q Division was originally located at 443 Albany Street in Boston, but moved to a two-studio facility on Highland Ave. In Davis Square Somerville in 2000. The studio moved to Rindge Ave, Cambridge MA in 2023. Bands that have recorded at Q Division include Pixies, who recorded their debut album Surfer Rosa at the studio.

Other bands and artists who have recorded at the studio include James Taylor, Aimee Mann, Jerry Douglas, Buffalo Tom, Gigolo Aunts, Mighty Mighty Bosstones, Dropkick Murphys, Jon Brion, Merrie Amsterburg, YoYo Ma, The Click Five, Al Kooper, Morphine, Graham Parker, Fountains of Wayne, State Radio, Mission of Burma, and Abandoned Pools.

Recording engineers who have worked at Q Division include Mike Denneen, Jon Lupfer, Rich Costey, Steve Albini, Kris Smith, Shane O'Connor, Sean Slade and Paul Kolderie.

References
Frank, Josh; Ganz, Caryn. "Fool the World: The Oral History of a Band Called Pixies." Virgin Books, 2006. .

External links
Official site

Recording studios in the United States
Somerville, Massachusetts